Willisau District is one of the five districts of the German-speaking Canton of Lucerne, Switzerland. Its capital is the town of Willisau. In 2013 its name was changed from Amt Willisau to Wahlkreis Willisau as part of a reorganization of the canton. A sixth Wahlkreis was created, but in Willisau everything else remained essentially unchanged.

Willisau District consists of the following municipalities:

 1992/97 survey gives a total area of  without including certain large lakes, while the 2000 survey includes lakes but due to other changes is slightly lower.

Mergers
On 1 January 2020 the former municipality of Ebersecken merged into Altishofen.
On 1 January 2021 the former municipality of Gettnau merged into Willisau.

References

Districts of the canton of Lucerne